Ansaldo Energia is an Italian engineering company.

Ansaldo may also refer to:

People
 Ansaldo (name)

Companies
 Gio. Ansaldo & C., an Italian engineering company founded in 1853, and taken over in 1993 by Finmeccanica (now Leonardo S.p.A.)
 Ansaldo Breda, a subsidiary of Finmeccanica, sold in 2015 to Hitachi Rail
 AnsaldoBreda Driverless Metro, a driverless electric train related and signaling system
 Ansaldo Electric Drives, motor manufacturer of the Fiat Doblò
 Ansaldo STS, an Italian maker of railroad control equipment

Cars
 Ansaldo (car), a series of Italian cars produced between 1921 and 1931
 Ansaldo Armored Car (1925), a prototype of armored car based on a Pavesi heavy tractor
 Autoblindo Fiat-Ansaldo, an Italian armored car with an autocannon and a turret
 Fiat Ansaldo, an Italian armoured car produced in 1925
 Fiat-Ansaldo M13/40, a tank designed for the Italian Army at the start of World War II
 L3/35, an Italian tankette operating since 1929

Aircraft
 Fiat-Ansaldo A.S.1, a basic light touring aircraft developed in Italy in the late 1920s
 Ansaldo A.1 Balilla, Italy's only domestically designed fighter aircraft of World War I 
 Ansaldo SVA, a family of Italian reconnaissance biplane aircraft of World War I
 Ansaldo AC.2, a single-seat fighter aircraft of the 1920s, bought by Italy
 Italian aircraft manufactured by the Ansaldo company

See also
 Ansaldi